In statistics and econometrics, the first-difference (FD) estimator is an estimator used to address the problem of omitted variables with panel data. It is consistent under the assumptions of the fixed effects model. In certain situations it can be more efficient than the standard fixed effects (or "within") estimator.

The estimator requires data on a dependent variable, and independent variables, for a set of individual units  and time periods .

Derivation 
The FD estimator avoids bias due to some unobserved, time-invariant variable , using the repeated observations over time:

Differencing the equations, gives:

which removes the unobserved .

The FD estimator  is then obtained by using the differenced terms for x and u in OLS:
  
Let   and define  analogously.
Under the assumption of homoskedasticity and no serial correlation, mathematically that, the asymptotic variance can be estimated with

where  is given by

Properties 
To be unbiased, the fixed estimator (FE) requires strict exogeneity, . The first difference estimator is also unbiased under this assumption. Under the weaker assumption that , the FD estimator is consistent. Note that this assumption is less restrictive than the assumption of strict exogeneity which is required for consistency using the FE estimator when T is fixed. If T goes to infinity, then both FE and FD are consistent with the weaker assumption of contemporaneous exogeneity.

Relation to fixed effects estimator 
For , the FD and fixed effects estimators are numerically equivalent.

This is because the FD estimator induces no serial correlation when differencing the errors.

See also 
Factor analysis
Panel analysis

References

Estimator
Latent variable models